Narcisa Freixas i Cruells (13 December 1859 – 20 December 1926) was a Catalan sculptor, painter and composer. She was born in Sabadell, Barcelona, the daughter of Pere Freixas Sabater, and first studied painting and sculpture with Modest Urgell i de Torcuato Tasso. However, she developed an interest in music and began the study of piano with Juan Bautista Pujol. She married Miquel Petit, a doctor who died soon afterward, and also lost her daughter at a young age.

After 1900 Freixas published collections of Catalan songs and nursery rhymes, and helped foster musical education for school children in Barcelona. She died in Barcelona in 1926.

Works
Freixas composed for voice and instruments and was known for children's songs. Selected compositions include:
La font del romaní for voice and piano
L'ametller ('A mig aire de la serra veig un ametller florit'), for voice and piano
La barca ('La doncella baixa al riu al trenc de l'alba'), for voice and piano   
La son soneta, for voice and piano   
Primaveral ('On va el Sol de març revestit de festa?'), for voice and piano   
L'ombra de Natzaret ('Sentadeta va filant la Natsarena Maria'), for voice and piano   
Dolorosa ('Rient les penes fugen de quí les té'), for voice and piano    '
Lo filador d'or ('N'hi ha un argenter a l'Argenteria'), for voice and piano   
Ai, l'esperança ('Era una tarda serena'), for voice and piano

A collection of her children's songs in Spanish was published in 1927 titled Cancons D'Infants.

Discography
 Compositores catalanes. Generació modernista (CD). Maria Teresa Garrigosa (soprano) and Heidrun Bergander (piano). La mà de guido. Dip.leg. B-45116-2008. Contains songs by Narcisa Freixas, Carmen Karr, Isabel Güell i López, and Luisa Casagemas.

 CD "Narcisa Freixas (1859-1926) Piano integral". Ester Vela (pianista).La mà de guido. LMG 2161. Dip.leg. B-23421-2019.

References

1859 births
1926 deaths
19th-century classical composers
20th-century classical composers
Spanish women classical composers
Spanish music educators
Women classical composers
20th-century Spanish musicians
People from Sabadell
Women music educators
20th-century women composers
19th-century women composers
20th-century Spanish women